Herman Moussaki (born 10 February 1999) is a Congolese professional footballer who plays as a forward for US Boulogne, on loan from Stade Malherbe Caen.

Club career
Moussaki joined the youth academy of Stade Malherbe Caen in 2016 from CS Bretigny. He made his senior debut for Caen in a 1–0 Ligue 1 loss to Angers SCO on 13 April 2019. On 7 May 2019 he signed his first professional contract with the club.

On 5 October 2020, Moussaki was loaned to US Boulogne in the Championnat National for the 2019–20 season. During the loan he scored his first senior goal, in a 2–2 draw with Créteil on 24 October 2020.

International career
Moussaki was called up to the Republic of the Congo U23s for March 2019.

References

External links
 
 SM Caen Profile
 
 

1999 births
Living people
Sportspeople from Brazzaville
Republic of the Congo footballers
Association football forwards
Stade Malherbe Caen players
US Boulogne players
Ligue 1 players
Championnat National players
Championnat National 2 players
Republic of the Congo expatriate footballers
Republic of the Congo expatriate sportspeople in France
Expatriate footballers in France